Agremiação Sportiva Arapiraquense, commonly referred to as ASA de Arapiraca or ASA, is a Brazilian professional football club based in Arapiraca, Alagoas. It competes in the Série D, the fourth tier of Brazilian football, as well as in the Campeonato Alagoano, the top flight of the Alagoas state football league.

History
Arapiraca had as Mayor the Dr. Coaracy da Mata Fonseca. The city, still small, was beginning to tread the path of progress. The fair was already beginning to stand out in the entire Brazilian Northeast. The company Camilo Colier was building the railway and that required the work of many people. And these people were looking for some fun on days off. And at the request of the employees, the company's management decided to build a soccer field. The team was formed, which obtained the suggestive name of Ferroviário, with the colors black and white. The city's Sunday afternoons became busier, as its inhabitants had the right place to go, the station field. But the construction of the railway was completed. The team ended and Sunday afternoon fun was gone.

Businessmen and city officials were not content with the void caused by the lack of football. After several discussions, on 25 September 1952, the Associação Sportiva de Arapiraca, was the ASA that emerged from the entrepreneurial force of Mr. Antônio Pereira Rocha, the first president. In 1977, the club began to be called Agremiação Sportiva Arapiraquense, remaining the same ASA.

The club is the third largest state champion in Alagoas, with 7 titles. In the national scenario, the club was runner-up of Campeonato Brasileiro Série C after losing to América Mineiro in 2009. In 2013, reached the final of the Copa do Nordeste, but was defeated to Campinense.

In 2002, ASA gained prominence by eliminating Palmeiras still in the first round of Copa do Brasil.

Symbols

Crest
The emblem has as its base structure three concentric circles (representing the union of the crowd), with the motto - Agremiação Sportiva Arapiraquense, in the core of the shield, the sinister, an oval geometric figure representing a leaf of bipartisan (smoke green) and white (mature smoke) and in this, the name ASA. On the right, suggesting a line where the smoke is exposed to the sun for its drying in the field, having in the central part, symbolizing Arapiraca, the "radiant star", an integral part of the hymn of the municipality, by the poet and educator Pedro de França Reis.

Nicknames
In the 60's, the club consolidated with two state runners-up (1967 and 1970) and decided to venture out on excursions through the Northeast. Here ASA, a club unknown in the region, and led by its greatest ace Acebílio, defeated opponents wherever he went, scaring teams that had no idea where the team had come from. From these victorious and legendary excursions came the nickname of Phantom of the Alagoas.

In the following decade, the ASA began to scare the opponents in the national scope, obtaining five successive victories in the Brazilian championship of 1979, being able to figure for the first time between the forty better teams of the country.

Alvinegro has grown and continues to scare his opponents, bringing joy to his fans, who have turned the myth into a mascot.

Stadium
ASA's home matches are usually played at Fumeirão, which has a maximum capacity of 10,000 people.

Current squad

Honours
 Campeonato Alagoano: 7
1953, 2000, 2001, 2003, 2005, 2009, 2011

 Copa Alagoas: 3
2015, 2020, 2021

 Copa Alagipe: 1
2005

References

External links
 Official Site

 
Association football clubs established in 1952
ASA
1952 establishments in Brazil